Georg Gyssling (16 June 1893 – 8 January 1965) was German consul to the United States from 1927 until 1941, since 1933 in Los Angeles. He was a member of the Nazi Party from 1931.

Early life 
Gyssling was born in 1893 in Walzen, Upper Silesia, in Imperial Germany. He enlisted in the Imperial German Army during World War I, and after the war earned a doctorate of German law. He became a diplomat for the German Foreign Office and in 1927 arrived in the United States as a German Consul.

Olympic career 
Gyssling was also a bobsledder who competed in the early 1930s. The German team finished seventh and last in the four-man event at the 1932 Winter Olympics in Lake Placid, New York.

Hitler’s man in Hollywood
Gyssling was the German Foreign Office representative in Los Angeles, and was sometimes referred to as "Hitler's Hollywood consul". He had a specific brief to monitor the activities of the studios, and by all accounts he was extremely diligent and effective in his duties. Nevertheless, later documents revealed that Gyssling despised Adolf Hitler and the Nazi Party, yearned for a return to a more democratic (albeit nationalistic) Germany, and gave classified information to American intelligence officials before World War II began.

Personal life 
Gyssling was married in 1925 to a German woman named Ingrid Horn, with whom he had two children, Georg and Angelica. Gyssling and Ingrid eventually divorced, and he died in southern Spain on January 8, 1965.

See also 
Nazism and cinema

References

German diplomats
Bobsledders at the 1932 Winter Olympics
German male bobsledders
1893 births
1965 deaths
Nazi Party members
Officials of Nazi Germany
American spies
Interwar-period spies
German expatriates in the United States